Bienvenue chez moi is a 1995 album recorded by French singer Florent Pagny. It can be considered a compilation because it contains the singer's previous hit singles, plus some new songs. It was his fourth album overall and was released on September 26, 1995. It achieved huge success in France and Belgium (Wallonia), where it remained charted respectively for 81 and 73 weeks, including several weeks atop. There are three duets on this album : "I Don't Know", with Noa, "Jamais", with Johnny Hallyday and "Oh Happy Day", with La Chorale des Cherubins de Sarcelles. The cover version of Lucio Dalla's song, "Caruso", was released as single and became a success (#2 in France, #3 in Belgium).

Track listing 
 "Bienvenue chez moi" (Erick Benzi) — 4:11
 "N'importe quoi" (Pagny, Vernoux) — 3:51
 "Si tu veux m'essayer" (Sam Brewski) — 4:03
 "Ça fait des nuits" (Pagny) — 3:57
 "Tue-moi" (Basset, Langolff) — 3:38
 "Est-ce que tu me suis ?" (Brewski) — 4:31
 "I Don't Know" (duet with Noa) — 4:43
 "Caruso" (Lucio Dalla) — 5:44
 "Jamais" (Arzel, Canada) (duet with Johnny Hallyday) — 3:36
 "Laissez-nous respirer" (Pagny) — 4:03
 "Presse qui roule" (Pagny) — 4:43
 "Qu'est-ce qu'on a fait ?" (Pagny) — 4:10
 "Oh Happy Day" (Hawkins) (duet with La Chorale des Cherubins de Sarcelles) — 5:10
 "Merci" (Pagny) — 4:14

Source : Allmusic.

Charts

Certifications and sales

Releases

References 

1995 greatest hits albums
Florent Pagny albums
Albums produced by Erick Benzi